Psathyrella bipellis is a species of mushroom in the family Psathyrellaceae.

Taxonomy
The species was originally described in 1884 by French mycologist Lucien Quélet, under the name Psathyra bipellis. Alexander H. Smith transferred it to the genus Psathyrella in 1946.

References

External links

Psathyrellaceae
Fungi of North America
Fungi described in 1884